Stephen Sarre Reynolds (born 3 February 1974), is an Australia-born artist, currently residing in Los Angeles.

Biography
Reynolds was born to Richard and Coralie Reynolds of Melbourne.  Educated at Xavier College Melbourne, he was both Prefect and House President, graduating in 1991.

Completing tertiary education at Melbourne University and Sydney University, he graduated with a Bachelor of Arts in 1996.

Reynolds is married to Sarah Chuldenko Reynolds, step-granddaughter of former United States president Jimmy Carter.

Music
From 1998 to 2004 Reynolds was guitarist, songwriter and founding member of Australian punk/rock act The Surrogate. EP releases in 2002 (Gentleman's Hardcore) and 2004 (Quell Dommage) garnered significant airplay on the Australian national broadcaster TripleJ. The second EP was released after signing to Universal Music Publishing in the same year. Reynolds left the group soon after and relocated to the United States after travelling in Europe and Asia.

Artistic work
Reynolds has painted for over twenty years; his first solo exhibition was at the Patrizia Autore Gallery in Melbourne in 2001. He has subsequently been in over a two dozen group exhibitions in Melbourne, Los Angeles and New York, including 'Endurance' at the Abington Art Centre in Philadelphia, PA, 2009, 3Document (42nd st New York, with Chashama) and Tension/Release at Caren Golden Fine Art, Chelsea, New York. Solo exhibitions include  'Secret and Whisper' (Melbourne, 2004)  'Come in From the River' at New York's La Maison d'Art, (New York, 2010) 'Where After The Valley?' (Los Angeles River, 2014, with support from the US Army Corps of Engineers) and most recently 'This Winter Ends' (Los Angeles 2021). Reynolds was co-founder of underground New York art collective x+rey, active from 2004 to 2008. During this time Reynolds began working as a director and freelance photographer for Getty images, contributing work to the Obama '08 campaign. He has directed, photographed and edited over 150 music videos, shorts and commercials including over 40 videos for Australian retail giant Cotton On.  In 2006 he wrote and directed the television advertising campaign for the Democratic Nominee for US Senate (NV), and for Jason Carter, the Democratic Gubernatorial candidate for Georgia in 2014. He has worked building sculptures for various Disneyland theme parks (LA, Orlando, Tokyo) and recently garnered international acclaim for his installation for Cara Delavigne (the #vaginatunnel) with widespread coverage including Architectural Digest, The Guardian, and a segment on the Late Show with Stephen Colbert. Reynolds is currently working on a series of NFT's and new sculptural work at his studio in Hollywood, Los Angeles.

References

External links
X plus Rey website from New York era
Official website
 Former Blog site]

1974 births
Living people
Australian artists
Artists from Los Angeles
Jimmy Carter
Artists from Melbourne
Australian emigrants to the United States